Lysicarpus is a genus of trees in the family Myrtaceae described as a genus in 1858. It contains a single known species, Lysicarpus angustifolius, endemic to the State of Queensland in Australia. It is known there as the brown hazelwood or budgeroo.

References

Myrtaceae
Monotypic Myrtaceae genera
Myrtales of Australia
Endemic flora of Queensland